The Black Torment (a.k.a. Estate of Insanity) is a 1964 British gothic horror film directed by Robert Hartford-Davis and starring John Turner, Heather Sears and Ann Lynn. The film is set in 18th-century Devon and was scripted by brothers Donald and Derek Ford. In terms of plot and setting it shares many similarities with the Hammer Horror productions of the 1960s, but was made by a smaller studio, Compton Films (see Tony Tenser). The Ford brothers later scripted Corruption (1968), also directed by Robert Hartford-Davis.

Plot
The film opens with Lucy Judd, a young woman, running in panic through a nocturnal wood. She is tracked down and cornered by a figure in black who puts his hands around her throat.

The scene then switches to daytime and a horse-drawn carriage containing Sir Richard Fordyke and his new bride Elizabeth, who is being brought from London to meet her new father-in-law for the first time. Elizabeth is nervous and anxious, hoping to make a good impression but worried that she will not pass muster. Sir Richard assures her that his father will love her just as he does, but warns her that his father is "a shadow of the man he once was", having been crippled by a stroke and now able only to communicate by sign language. A complicating factor is that the only person who can interpret his signing is the devoted Diane, sister to Sir Richard's first wife Anne who died by her own hand four years previously after becoming deranged over her inability to bear a child.

On arrival in his home village, Sir Richard, having expected a warm welcome after his absence and marriage, finds himself treated with rudeness and barely disguised suspicion by his tenants, such as Black John, the local blacksmith. His coachman Tom asks a villager the reason for the sudden hostility towards his previously well-liked master and is told that shocking events have been taking place, culminating in the rape and murder of Lucy who, before she died, screamed out Sir Richard's name. Sir Richard and Elizabeth's arrival at Fordyke Hall is met by an oddly stiff and formal welcome from the staff and Diane. When challenged, steward Seymour tells Sir Richard of wild rumours circulating in the village about Lucy's last words. Sir Richard points out that he was probably in London when the attack happened, but Seymour states that logic cannot assuage the villagers' primitive suspicions and talk of witchcraft, particularly since enquiries have established there were no strangers in the vicinity at the time.

Events quickly take a sinister turn as a copy of Anne's suicide note is anonymously delivered to Elizabeth. The window from which Anne jumped becomes mysteriously unbolted at night. Sir Richard sees what he believes to be the ghost of his dead wife in the garden. Meanwhile, after enjoying an illicit nocturnal frolic in a barn with her fiancé, Mary, one of the housemaids, is strangled like Lucy (but not raped). A stablehand tells Sir Richard that one of his horses is being taken out and ridden at night by an unknown woman, and a saddle inscribed with Anne's name is delivered. The saddler insists that Sir Richard ordered it in person, despite Sir Richard's insistence that he has been nowhere near the village for three months. Colonel Wentworth informs Sir Richard that there are numerous reports of his having been seen riding around the neighbourhood at night during his supposed absence in London, pursued by "Anne" who keeps shouting the word "murderer". Those who have seen the spectacle are speaking of witchcraft and devilry.

Unable to explain the strange goings-on, Sir Richard doubts his sanity, and his marriage comes under strain as Elizabeth herself struggles to make sense of events. When Sir Richard again sees the ghost in the garden at night, he mounts his horse and gives chase, only to find himself being pursued on horseback by a white-clad "Anne".  He is apprehended by the local militia but is let go. He returns to Fordyke Hall, where Elizabeth insists he left her only moments before. Believing she too has turned against him and is now somehow involved in the plot to incriminate him or drive him mad, he attempts to strangle her, managing to stop himself from killing her just in time. Ultimately, he manages to uncover the real culprits and their motives but cannot prevent another murder from being committed. He has to take part in a vicious swordfight before he can reveal the truth.

Cast

 John Turner as Sir Richard Fordyke
 Heather Sears as Lady Elizabeth Fordyke
 Ann Lynn as Diane
 Peter Arne as Seymour
 Norman Bird as Harris
 Raymond Huntley as Colonel John Wentworth
 Joseph Tomelty as Sir Giles Fordyke
 Francis de Wolff as Black John

 Patrick Troughton as Regis
 Derek Newark as Tom
 Edina Ronay as Lucy Judd
 Annette Whiteley as Mary
 Kathy McDonald as Kate
 Roger Croucher as Brian
 Charles Houston as Jenkins

Critical Reception

Despite a handsomely mounted production with fine costumes and a quality cast, the film has largely been considered an inferior example of its kind by authors of movie guides. For instance, the entry on it in Horror: The Aurum Film Encyclopedia reads, in part: "This is a crude British attempt to match the Italian horror movies of the period. The sloppily constructed plot is set in 1780 (etc)...The film's tone is set in a pre-credit sequence showing a young woman (Ronay) running through the woods trying to escape a murderous rapist. The cutting is predictable, the sound grossly over-emphatic, the colour ugly and the tension non-existent. Sears, so effective in Fisher's The Phantom of the Opera, is miscast as Turner's new bride." John Stanley writes that the cast "work to make all this unbelievable stuff believable."

References

External links 
 
 
 The Black Torment at British Horror Films
 

1964 films
1964 horror films
British horror films
Films directed by Robert Hartford-Davis
Films set in the 18th century
Films set in Devon
1960s English-language films
1960s British films